Natasha Rose Wheat (born
October 25, 1981) is an interdisciplinary artist who lives and works in the United States.

Her works have been described as situational constructions, often transforming her audience into co-participants in the work.

She is the founder of Portland, Oregon based arts and urban farming project, Project Grow, an arts atelier for people with disabilities at the site of a factory. It began in 2008 as an intervention into sweatshop type labor at a factory where the people with disabilities were working. Wheat's longtime boyfriend is artist Jim Fairchild.

References

Living people
1981 births
Interdisciplinary artists
School of the Art Institute of Chicago alumni